The Furman Paladins football program is the intercollegiate American football team for the Furman University located in the state of South Carolina. The team competes in the NCAA Division I Football Championship Subdivision (FCS) as members of the Southern Conference (SoCon). The school's first football team was fielded in 1889. The team plays its home games at the 16,000 seat Paladin Stadium in Greenville, South Carolina.

The 1988 Furman Paladins football team, coached by Jimmy Satterfield won the NCAA Division I Football Championship. Clay Hendrix has served as the team's head coach since 2017.

History

Classifications
 1937–1942: NCAA College Division
 1946–1957: NCAA University Division
 1958–1972: NCAA College Division
 1973–1977: NCAA Division I
 1978–1981: NCAA Division I–A
 1982–present: NCAA Division I–AA/FCS

Conference memberships
 1889–1896: Independent
 1897–1899: No football team
 1900–1901: Independent
 1902: Southern Intercollegiate Athletic Association
 1903–1912: No football team
 1913–1914: Independent
 1915–1929: Southern Intercollegiate Athletic Association
 1930–1931: Independent
 1932–1935: Southern Intercollegiate Athletic Association
 1936–present: Southern Conference

Championships

National championships

Conference championships
The Paladins have won 14 conference titles, all in the Southern Conference, with seven shared and seven outright.

NCAA Division I-AA/FCS playoff results
The Paladins have appeared in the NCAA Division I Football Championship playoffs 19 times with a record of 20–18. They were national champions in 1988 and runner-up in 1985 and 2001.

Furman vs. in-state NCAA Division I schools

Notable former players

 Braniff Bonaventure
 Luther Broughton
 Ben Browder
 Sederrik Cunningham
 Dakota Dozier
 Jerome Felton
 Omari Hardwick
 Clay Hendrix
 Louis Ivory
 Stanford Jennings
 Bob King
 Bobby Lamb
 Ingle Martin
 William Middleton
 Billy Napier 
 Bear Rinehart
 Orlando Ruff
 Terry Smith
 James H. Speer
 Ryan Steed
 David Whitehurst
 Sam Wyche

Players in the NFL Draft

Key

Future non-conference opponents 
Announced schedules as of December 8, 2022.

References

External links
 

 
American football teams established in 1889
1889 establishments in South Carolina